Alexander George Crockett (February 22, 1862 – July 27, 1919) was an American Democratic politician who served as a member of the Virginia Senate, representing the state's 5th district.

References

External links
 
 

1862 births
1919 deaths
Democratic Party Virginia state senators
20th-century American politicians
People from Wythe County, Virginia